Tanbar is an outback locality in the Shire of Barcoo, Queensland, Australia.  It is on the corner of Queensland's southern and western border with South Australia. In the  Tanbar had a population of 3 people.

Geography
Haddon Corner is the point of Queensland's southern and western border with South Australia. It is in the south-west of the locality.

Lake Yamma Yamma (also known as Lake Mackillop) is in the centre of the locality. It rarely fills (about every 25 to 30 years). It is Queensland's largest ephemeral lake. 

The Birdsville Developmental Road enters the locality from the north (Farrars Creek), passes through the north of the locality, and exits to the north-west (Birdsville). Arrabury Road branches off from the Birdsville Developmental Road shortly after it enters the locality and then proceeds south-west and then south into Durham (remaining west of Lake Yamma Yamma).

The land use is grazing on native vegetation.

History
The name Haddon Corner is derived from Haddon Downs, the pastoral property in the corner on the South Australian side. It was established in 1877 by pastoralists William and John Howie.

In the  Tanbar had a population of 3 people.

Heritage listings 

Heritage-listed sites in Tanbar include:
 Haddon Corner, where a survey marker indicates the corner

Economy
There are a number of homesteads in the locality, including:

 Arrabury
 Curalle Tin Shed
 Gilpeppee Outstation
 Nulla Outstation
 Planet Downs Outstation, outstation of Arrabury
 Tanbar Station

Education
There are no schools in Tanbar and none nearby. Distance education and boarding schools are the options.

Transport
There are a number of airstrips in the locality, including:

 Arrabury airstrip, serving the homestead
Arrabury airstrip
Planet Downs Outstation airstrip, serving the outstation
Tanbar airstrip, serving the homestead 

References

External links

Shire of Barcoo
Localities in Queensland